Pacific Place may refer to:

 Pacific Place (Seattle), a shopping centre in Seattle, United States
 Pacific Place Jakarta, a shopping centre in Jakarta, Indonesia
 Pacific Place (Dallas), a skyscraper in Dallas, United States
 Pacific Place (Hong Kong), a complex of office towers, hotels and shopping centre in Hong Kong
 Concord Pacific Place, an urban redevelopment area in Vancouver, Canada